Events from the year 1730 in Canada.

Incumbents
French Monarch: Louis XV
British and Irish Monarch: George II

Governors
Governor General of New France: Charles de la Boische, Marquis de Beauharnois
Colonial Governor of Louisiana: Étienne Perier
Governor of Nova Scotia: Lawrence Armstrong
Commodore-Governor of Newfoundland: Henry Osborn

Events
 Seven Cherokee chiefs visit London and form an alliance, The Articles of Agreement, with King George II.
 1730s: The Mississauga drive the Seneca Iroquois south of Lake Erie.

Births

Deaths
Antoine Laumet Cadillac, founder of Detroit.

Historical documents
Jesuit's long report on Saguenay region, it's geography and Mistassini Cree, and Innu (Montagnais) near Tadoussac (Note: "savages" used)

New York governor seeks way to subsidize Oswego garrison and trade (key to Six Nations support) with tax acceptable to Assembly and Crown

"That they might live and settle among them" - French and Meskwaki (Fox) in Seneca territory concern New York Indian commissioners

N.Y. legislators on backfired past attempt to squeeze French out of Indigenous trade, and effect of current trouble from Oswego traders

French send "a thousand sail of ships annually" to fish off Newfoundland and had 220,000 quintals of cod for Marseille market in 1730

Legal advice that Newfoundland justices' powers don't include judging property cases, and taxation must have consent of some popular assembly

"Hundreds of these poor creatures are beging [sic] up and down" - Servants' wages are withheld at end of fishing season, leaving them destitute

Fishing admirals hold themselves superior to justices of the peace and Governor Osborn, whose authority is "only from the Privy Council"

"So avers to all Government" - Fishing captains and traders won't support civil authority, even at tax rate of "one farthing in the pound"

Newfoundlanders ask protection from price gouging by "masters of shipps," and that their flax and hemp "be sent home freight free"

History of 1720s fighting between Saint George River settlers and "French Indians" to keep former's land out of "the hands of the Indians"

Surveyor of His Majesty's Woods told to, "by the most gentle usage," deter Penobscot from hindering settlement beyond Saint George River

In face of aggressiveness from Massachusetts, David Dunbar reaches out to Penobscot and their Canada-educated, mixed-race comrade

Gov. Belcher objects to Dunbar's settlements between Sagadahoc (Kennebec) River and Gulf of St. Lawrence, which Massachusetts claims

Nova Scotia governor offers Dunbar his limited advice on Penobscot (Note: "animals" and "savages" used)

Dunbar relates complaints of Minas region merchants required to discount wares they supply to Annapolis Royal garrison

Sure that his own settlements will take years to actualize, Gov. Philipps envies way new "Province of Maine" governor attracts settlers

David Dunbar criticized for settlement names like "Province of Georgia" (it's Nova Scotia land) and "Fredericksburg" (which isn't English)

Fidelity oath (in French) signed by Annapolis Acadians, plus their address welcoming governor's written assurance of religious rights

1755 Acadian petition includes 1730 fidelity oath (in English) and testimony that Gov. Philipps promised them neutrality at that time

With brief French lesson, Trade Board says oath given to Annapolis Acadians doesn't actually require their fidelity to His Majesty

"Good management, plain reasoning and presents" - Philipps reports that Indigenous and French have submitted to British governance

Oath of allegiance signed by 591 of "the French inhabitants of Nova Scotia"

Philipps again appeals for adequate defence of Canso, pointing out its £30-40,000 value in duties and its 6–7 hours march from French forces

Philipps told issuing settler-requested £2,000 in paper money impossible "till you shall have an Assembly," and then with "very great caution"

David Dunbar worried about working in Nova Scotia, where people are afraid to travel and "are even insulted in their garrisons"

Philipps to assist in settling Irish and Palatines in defensible townships between Penobscot and St. Croix rivers (Note: "savage" used)

Fine and prison sentence set for "wild fellows who catch the horses in the fields and race them to the great detriment of the beasts"

Hudson's Bay Company employee reports on wild rice, good grass for hay, and thriving fruit trees (!) in Moose River country

Governors instructed not to seize whale products or discourage that fishery but "to encourage the same to the utmost of their power"

References

 
Canada
30